France was the host nation for the 1968 Winter Olympics in Grenoble.  It was the second time that France had hosted the Winter Olympic Games (after the 1924 Games in Chamonix), and the fourth time overall (after the 1900 and 1924 Summer Olympics, both in Paris).

Medalists

Alpine skiing

Men

Men's slalom

Women

Biathlon

Men

 1 One minute added per close miss (a hit in the outer ring), two minutes added per complete miss.

Men's 4 x 7.5 km relay

 2 A penalty loop of 200 metres had to be skied per missed target.

Bobsleigh

Cross-country skiing

Men

Men's 4 × 10 km relay

Figure skating

Men

Women

Ice hockey

Consolation round 
Teams in this group play for 9th-14th places. France entered in this round, from the start, they did not play for a medal.

  Norway –  France 4:1 (1:1, 2:0, 1:0)
Goalscorers: Hagensen, Smefjell, Dalsören, Mikkelsen – Liberman.

 France –  Romania 3:7 (0:2, 0:2, 3:3)
Goalscorers: Itzicsohn, Mazza, Lacarriere – Iuliu Szabo 2, Florescu 2, Pana, Geza Szabo, Stefan.

 France –  Austria 2:5 (0:1, 2:3, 0:1)
Goalscorers: Faucomprez, Caux – Puschnig 2, Kirchbaumer, St. John, Schupp.

 France –  Yugoslavia 1:10 (0:6, 0:1, 1:3)
Goalscorers: Itzicsohn – Tisler 3, Ivo Jan 2, Felc 2, Beravs, Roman Smolej, Hiti.

 France –  Japan 2:6 (0:0, 0:4, 2:2)
Goalscorers: Mazza, Faucomprez – Ebina 2, Hikigi, Itoh, Okajima, Araki.

Contestants
14. FRANCE
Goaltenders: Jean-Claude Sozzi, Bernard Deschamps
Defence: Joel Godeau, Claude Blanchard, Philippe Lacarriere, René Blanchard, Joel Gauvin  
Forwards: Bernard Cabanis, Gerard Faucomprez, Alain Mazza, Olivier Prechac, Gilbert Lepre, Patrick Pourtanel, Michel Caux, Gilbert Itzicsohn, Daniel Grando, Patrick Francheterre, Charles Liberman.

Luge

Men

(Men's) Doubles

Women

Nordic combined 

Events:
 normal hill ski jumping 
 15 km cross-country skiing

Ski jumping

Speed skating

Men

Women

References
Official Olympic Reports
International Olympic Committee results database
 Olympic Winter Games 1968, full results by sports-reference.com

Nations at the 1968 Winter Olympics
1968
Winter Olympics